Bank Asya was established in October 24, 1996 with its head office in Istanbul, as the sixth private finance house of Turkey. The company's name, which had been previously "Asya Finans Kurumu Anonim Şirketi" (Asya Finance Incorporated Company), was changed into "Asya Katilim Bankasi Anonim Şirketi" (Asya Participation Bank Inc.) on December 20, 2005.

Bank Asya, with an initial capital of TRY2 million and paid up capital of TRY900 million, had a multi-partnered structure based on domestic capital. At the end of 2009, Bank Asya’s total assets reached TRY14 billion. Bank Asya rose by 47 places in the “Top 1000 World Bank Ranking” of “The Banker” Magazine in 2010, rising to 473 from 520. At the same time, Bank Asya ranked 403rd on “The Banker’s Top 500 Banking Brands”. Bank Asya has also become the largest participation bank in Turkey.

Bank Asya carried out its activities with 182 branches, 2 national and 1300 foreign correspondent banks besides the head office units as of May 2011.

The bank has been strongly tied to the controversial Gülen movement, led by the Islamic cleric and preacher Fethullah Gülen, and is widely considered to be founded and operated by his followers. By the end of 2013, the relationship between the Gulen movement and the ruling AK Party soured, and the Gulen movement was declared a national security threat. Consequently, Bank Asya lost a large fraction of its deposits and its lucrative contracts with government agencies. Its net income plummeted 81% in the second quarter of 2014. Its stock is currently suspended from trading by BIST (Istanbul Stock Exchange), due to uncertainties regarding its ownership structure. Two separate acquisition deals (by Qatar Islamic Bank and by Turkish state owned Ziraat Bank) fell apart. Finally, on August 25, 2014, Moody's downgraded the bank with the statement "During this period, the bank's net income declined by 81% compared to last year. Additionally asset quality also deteriorated. These sharp deterioration trends in financial fundamentals resulted in lowering the bank's rating."

On 22 July 2016, the Banking Regulation and Supervision Agency (BDDK) cancelled Bank Asya's banking permissions as part of the 2016 purges.

History 

1996
 Bank Asya was founded on October 24 in Istanbul, Turkey

1997

 14 branches were opened in 10 cities (branches include Kadiköy, Merter, Şişli, Güneşli, Pendik(İstanbul), Ulus (Ankara), İzmir, Bursa, Konya, Gaziantep, Kayseri, Eskişehir, Antalya and Aydin)

1998
 Bank Asya launched credit card activities
 Established online banking correspondence with all Yapı Kredi branches
 Sultanhamam branch was opened

1999
 Bank Asya became subject to Turkish Banking Law

2000
 Online Banking became available to the public
 9 branches were opened (branches include Ostim (Ankara), Diyarbakir, Erenköy, Ümraniye, Fatih, Gaziosmanpaşa (İstanbul), Gebze, Erzurum and Samsun)

2001
 The Union of Private Finance Houses was founded
 The Regulation for Foundation and Activities of Private Finance Houses began operations on September 20

2002
 3 branches were opened (branches include Denizli, Adapazari and Beylikdüzü)
 Private Finance Houses Private Current and Savings Accounts Safety Fund Regulation began operation on September 18
 Installment credit cards were launched
 ATMs were put into service
 Correspondent banking relations were established with Türk Ekonomi Bankasi and Denizbank branches

2003
 17 branches were opened
 Correspondent banking relation was established with Şekerbank branches
 Tax collection authority was granted by the Ministry of Finance
 Nationwide facility for credit card payment and money transfers by Asya Finans customers through on-line PTT branches was initiated
 Bank Asya became a member of VISA on October 24

2004
 Alo Asya (444 4 888) Telephone Banking was put into operation on January 1 and March 17, for retail and corporate customers, respectively
 19 branches were opened
 The organizational structure of the Head Office was changed and operations began being carried out by 24 units

2005
 The company name, which had been previously "Asya Finans Kurumu A.Ş.", was changed into "Asya Katilim Bankasi A.Ş."
 Membership agreement was signed with MasterCard on May 18
 Bank Asya launched chip credit card activities
 Bank Asya became registered in the presence of Trade Register Office of Istanbul on December 20
 Paid-up capital has increased from TL 120 million to TL 240 million
 11 branches were opened

2006
 On May 12, Bank Asya shares began trading at the (İstanbul Stock Exchange) ISE with the code of ASYAB
 Paid-up capital has increased from TL 60 million to TL 300

2007
 26 new branches were opened. Bank Asya branches have increased to 118
 New Head Office building in Ümraniye commenced service on October 1

2008
 Bank Asya became title sponsor for the First League of Turkish Football Federation
 AsyaCard DIT, the most extensive, off-line credit card of Europe, and AsyaPratik DIT, the first pre-paid bank card of Turkey, were brought into use
 The first transportation project with which AsyaCard can be used has been put into service and AsyaCard began to be used for transportation in Kahramanmaras
 Paid-up capital has increased to TL 900 million
 Number of branches has increased to 149

2009
 Bank Asya was displayed as the bank having the most effective performance in the "Top 1000 World Banks" list of financial magazine The Banker.
 The first contactless prepaid bank card of Turkey, DIT Pratik, ranked first in 2009 category
 A strategic cooperation agreement was signed between Bank Asya and ICD, one of the corporations of Islamic Development Bank (IDB) and Bank Asya went in a partnership with Senegal - based Tamweel Africa Holding SA
 Assets reached TL 11,6 billion; increasing 43% compared to the same period of the last year
 Reaching 22,2% profit rate Bank Asya has become the most profitable interest - free bank of Turkey for last three years
 Number of branches has increased to 158

2010
 Second Murabaha syndication - 250 million USD
 Bank Asya ranked 403 in The Banker‘s Top 500 Banking Brands listing the leading names

2011
 300 million USD murabaha syndication

Ratings

Moody's

Fitch

Former subsidiaries

Işık Sigorta
65.42% ownership - non-life insurance company with 183 million TL in assets.

TUNA REIT (Real Estate Investment Trust) 
Established in 2009 
Development of residential and saleable real estate and generation of rental revenue from its own real estate portfolio.
STRATEGY: IPO in 3 years

TAMWEEL Africa Holding 
Bank Asya and ICD (Islamic Corporation for the Development of the Private Sector), a subsidiary of the Islamic Development Bank jointly carry out interest-free banking activities in West Africa
Bank Asya owns a 40% stake and ICD 60% in Senegal-based Tamweel Africa Holding SA
Tamweel Africa Holding SA owns 4 banks in Niger, Senegal, Guinea, and Mauritania
Plans for opening 2 new banks in Benin and Mali
Partnership could expand up to 22 countries in Africa

References

Investor relations Board of Directors

External links
 

Banks of Turkey
Companies formerly affiliated with the Gülen movement
Defunct banks of Turkey
Banks established in 1996
Banks disestablished in 2016
Participation banks
Turkish companies established in 1996
2016 disestablishments in Turkey